A Time of Day is the fifth studio album by progressive rock band Anekdoten. The band produced the album itself after three years of song writing and four months of recording.

Track listing
 "The Great Unknown" (6:22)
 "30 Pieces" (7:13)
 "King Oblivion" (5:02)
 "A Sky About to Rain" (6:29)
 "Every Step I Take" (3:06)
 "Stardust and Sand" (4:29)
 "In for a Ride" (6:47)
 "Prince of the Ocean" (5:30)

Personnel
Peter Nordins – drums, cymbals, percussion, vibes
Anna Sofi Dahlberg – mellotron, organ, Moog, Rhodes, cello, piano, vocals
Nicklas Barker – vocals, guitar, mellotron, Moog, vibes
Jan Erik Liljeström – bass, vocals
Gunnar Bergsten – flute

External links

Anekdoten albums
2007 albums